God's Gift is the second soundtrack but 5th overall album by Romeo. On the second CD there was a movie based on a boxing film. The album was recorded at the end of 2004 to 2006. This was Romeo's first album to have explicit language. It featured many guest artists and has sold over 350,611 copies to date.

Track listing
Disc 1
"I'm Here" 2:11
"Get Money" (featuring C-Los) 4:26
"Can't Stop, Won't Stop" 3:27
"Country N Gutta" (featuring Lil' Boosie & Bengie) 4:32
"I Need a Stallione" (featuring Blakk, Gangsta & T-Bo) 4:10
"Pullin' Up" (featuring Bobby V) 3:00
"Sit N Low" (featuring Lil' D) 3:14
"Say It to My Face" (featuring Master P) 4:48
"Rock With It" (featuring Master P, C-Los & Playa) 4:30
"I'm a Beast"
"Confident"
"Slow It Down" (featuring JoJo)
"U Can't Shine Like Me" (featuring C-Los & Young-V) 4:33
"I'm the Baddest"
"Mama Said" 3:02
"Get Buck"
"Rock My Fitted" (featuring Rich Boyz, Lil' D) 4:41
"Just Me & You" (featuring Silkk The Shocker & C-Los) 3:53
"Pops, Im a Hustla" (featuring Playa, Ruga, C-Los & Tank Do) 4:51
"Tell The Band" (featuring Rich Boyz) 3:28

Disc 2
U Can't Shine Like Me [DVD]
Shine [DVD]
Won't Stop, Can't Stop [DVD]
We Can [DVD]

|}

See also
God's Gift

References

2006 albums
Romeo Miller albums

sv:God's Gift